St. Hedwig of Silesia Church is a wooden parish church located in Radoszowy, Kędzierzyn-Koźle County in Poland.

The former church was built in 1730. Until 1929, the church was dedicated to the Holy Cross. The church was renovated in 1890 and dismantled in 1928. The present church was built in 1929, as projected by architect Albert Kőhler from Pawłowiczki. The church underwent renovated in 2000, when its eternit roof was replaced with wood shingle.

References

Kędzierzyn-Koźle County
Radoszowy